Sybridae or Sybridai was a deme of ancient Attica, of the phyle of Erechtheis, sending one delegate every two years, to the Athenian Boule, with Pambotadae sending its delegate in lieu of Sybridae in intervening years. 

Its site is unlocated, although Pliny the Elder mentions a river Siberus.

People
Cephisodotus the Elder, sculptor

References

Populated places in ancient Attica
Former populated places in Greece
Demoi
Lost ancient cities and towns